Qinghaichthys is a subgenus the genus Triplophysa, stone loaches native to China. Some authorities recognise this as a valid genus but this is not recognised  by Fishbase.

Species
There are currently four recognized species in this genus, if it is accepted as valid:
 Triplophysa (Qinghaichthys) alticeps (Herzenstein, 1888)
 Triplophysa (Qinghaichthys) rotundiventris (Y. F. Wu & Yuan Chen, 1979)
 Triplophysa (Qinghaichthys) zaidamensis (Kessler, 1874)
 Triplophysa (Qinghaichthys) zamegacephalus (T. Q. Zhao, 1985)

References

Triplophysa
Animal subgenera